KCKR (91.9 FM) is a radio station broadcasting a religious format. Licensed to Church Point, Louisiana, United States, the station serves the Lafayette area.  The station is currently owned by Family Worship Center Church, Inc.

History
The station was assigned the call letters KCKR on October 23, 1996. On September 8, 2005, the station changed its call sign to the current KCKR. On March 27, 2007, the station was sold to Family Worship Center Church, Inc.

References

External links
http://sonlifetv.com

Radio stations established in 1996
Christian radio stations in Louisiana
1996 establishments in Louisiana
Acadia Parish, Louisiana